Magali Baton (born 13 March 1971) is a French judoka. She competed in the women's lightweight event at the 1996 Summer Olympics.

References

External links
 

1971 births
Living people
French female judoka
Olympic judoka of France
Judoka at the 1996 Summer Olympics
People from Saint-Chamond
Sportspeople from Loire (department)